Hawksford is a surname.

Notable persons with that surname
Daniel Hawksford, Welsh actor.
John Hawksford (1806–1887), solicitor, benefactor, served as 15th Mayor of Wolverhampton 1863/64 and became the first Roman Catholic to do so.
Professor Malcolm Hawksford, academic and author in the field of audio engineering.

See also
Hawkesford